Ariane Riecker (born in 1969) is a German author and director of documentaries and reports. She is known for her documentary Mein Vater, der Türke in collaboration with Marcus Vetter.

Life and career 

Ariane Riecker grew up in Berlin and Paris. After studying journalism and art history, Riecker worked as a freelance author. She published various non-fiction books, including Stasi intim with Dirk Schneider and Annett Schwarz. Gespräche mit ehemaligen MfS-Angehörigen (Talking to former MfS officials) (1990) and Laienspieler : sechs Politikerporträts (Amateur players: six political portraits) : Peter-Michael Diestel, Gregor Gysi, Regine Hildebrandt, Günther Krause, Wolfgang Thierse, Konrad Weiss : and an interview with Friedrich Schorlemmer (1991).

Riecker lived and worked in Los Angeles from 1999 to 2005. Her work during this time includes the documentary Dennis Hopper – Create Or Die, which premiered at the Berlinale in 2003.

Riecker has worked for ARD, ZDF, MDR, Arte and other broadcasters as a documentary and report director and scriptwriter since 2001.

Filmography 

 2002: Dennis Hopper – Create Or Die/Spiel Oder Stirb
 2006: Mein Vater der Türke
 2009/10: Damals nach der DDR
 2010/11: Hans Zimmer – Der Sound für Hollywood
 2012: Nur eine Spritze – Der größte Medienskandal der DDR
 2012: Was verdienen die Ostdeutschen?
 2012: Ist der Osten aufgebaut?
 2013: Generation Wende
 2014: Wetter und Architektur – Bauen für die Zukunft
 2015: Wem gehört der Osten?
 2016: Wer beherrscht den Osten?
 2017: Wer bezahlt den Osten?
 2017: Der Pflegeaufstand
 2018: Wer braucht den Osten?

Books 

 Stasi intim. Gespräche mit ehemaligen MfS-Angehörigen, Leipzig, Forum 1990, 
 Laienspieler : sechs Politikerporträts : Peter-Michael Diestel, Gregor Gysi, Regine Hildebrandt, Günther Krause, Wolfgang Thierse, Konrad Weiss : und ein Interview mit Friedrich Schorlemmer, Leipzig, Forum 1991,

Awards 

 Prix Europa 2006, together with Marcus Vetter (for: Mein Vater der Türke)
 Golden Gate Award 2007, together with Marcus Vetter (for: Mein Vater der Türke)
Preis der Friedrich- und Isabell-Vogelstiftung für herausragenden Wirtschaftsjournalismus 2017, together with Dirk Schneider (for: Wer bezahlt den Osten?)
Medienpreis Mittelstand 2018, together with Dirk Schneider (for: Wer bezahlt den Osten?)
Preis der Friedrich- und Isabell-Vogelstiftung für herausragenden Wirtschaftsjournalismus 2018, together with Dirk Schneider (for: Wer braucht den Osten?)

References

External links 
 

20th-century German women writers
21st-century German women writers
German documentary film directors
Women documentary filmmakers
German non-fiction writers
German women non-fiction writers
1969 births
Living people
Writers from Berlin
Film directors from Berlin